Joseph Pierre Raoul "Rene" Lafleur (March 21, 1899 – November 26, 1968) was a Canadian professional ice hockey forward who played one season in the National Hockey League for the Montreal Canadiens.

Playing career
Lafleur appeared in only one National Hockey League game in the 1924–25 season. The majority of his career was spent playing in the OCHL in Ottawa.

See also
List of players who played only one game in the NHL

External links

1899 births
1968 deaths
Canadian ice hockey forwards
Ice hockey people from Ottawa
Montreal Canadiens players